Alsophila podophylla, synonym Cyathea podophylla, is a widespread species of tree fern native to southern China, Taiwan, Vietnam, Laos, Thailand, Cambodia, and the Ryukyu Islands. It grows in forest by streams and in ravines at an altitude of 600–1000 m.

References

podophylla
Flora of the Ryukyu Islands
Flora of China
Flora of Taiwan
Flora of Indo-China